Southern Exposure (SoEx) is a not-for-profit arts organization and alternative art space founded in 1974 in the Mission District of San Francisco, California. It was originally founded as a grassroots, cooperative art gallery in conjunction with Project Artaud which was a live/work artist community. By the 1980s, they converted the gallery to a community space for supporting emerging artists.

Programs

Exhibitions and projects

Southern Exposure's exhibition program is curated by a committee of artists from the community. Each year, SoEx has a juried exhibition with an open call. The show is curated by a respected international curator. Past curators of the annual exhibition have included Magali Arriola, Tom Finkelpearl, and Kristan Kennedy.

Grant Program: Alternative Exposure
One of SoEx's main goals is to support the professional development of artists so they are able to live and work in the San Francisco Bay Area. The Alternative Exposure Grant program “supports the work of unincorporated groups, burgeoning art and gathering spaces, publications, Web sites, collectives, events and artists making work in a variety of ways.”

Alternative Exposure, was founded in partnership with the Andy Warhol Foundation for the Visual Arts, provides more than $65,000 of grants each year to individuals who work to promote other artists through exhibition spaces, publications, websites, critical writing and other activities. The Alternative Exposure program was initiated by former SoEx Executive Director Courtney Fink who first came to Southern Exposure in 2003 and departed in 2015.

Public programs
Since moving away from Project Artaud in 2006, Southern Exposure has supported "offsite" public art projects which happen in the city of San Francisco. SoEx's Artists in Education (AIE) program provides intensive art education programs to hundreds of underserved youth each year.

SoEx provides access to affordable art through its annual Monster Drawing Rally event, auctions and sale of limited editions art works. In 2020, the gallery served as an official polling location during the Consolidated General Election, aimed at improving civic discourse and justice.

References

External links
 Southern Exposure Website

Arts organizations based in the San Francisco Bay Area
Non-profit organizations based in California
Organizations based in San Francisco
Art museums and galleries in San Francisco
Mission District, San Francisco
Art galleries established in 1974
1974 establishments in California